Emmanuel Hagan (born 16 May 2000) is a Ghanaian footballer who plays college soccer for the University of North Carolina, Greensboro in NCAA Division I.

Career 
Born in Ghana, Hagan is a graduate of the Mirage Football Academy based in Accra.

A member of Orlando City's Club Development Academy system at Montverde Academy since 2018, he signed an academy contract with Orlando City's USL reserve affiliate Orlando City B for the 2019 season and made his professional debut on 30 March 2019, starting in a 3–1 loss to FC Tucson in the season opener.

In February 2020, Hagan signed a National Letter of Intent to play college soccer for NCAA Division I school UNC Greensboro beginning August 2020. As of 2022, he has made 49 appearances and scored three goals.

References

External links 
 
 Emmanuel Hagan at U.S. Soccer Development Academy
 Emmanuel Hagan at University of North Carolina, Greensboro Athletics

2000 births
Living people
Ghanaian footballers
Ghanaian expatriate footballers
Ghanaian expatriate sportspeople in the United States
Association football defenders
Expatriate soccer players in the United States
Orlando City B players
UNC Greensboro Spartans men's soccer players
Soccer players from Florida
Footballers from Accra
USL League One players